Felipe Roque de Moraes (born May 12, 1987) is a Brazilian actor and model.

Biography
Roque began his acting career at age 13. He also began his career as an international model.

He worked on the film S.O.S. Mulheres ao Mar 2, and made his television debut on the telenovela A Regra do Jogo, as Kim. Felipe went through 16 tests until becoming the protagonist of the twenty-fourth season of Malhação, to interpret the character Gabriel, but with the rejection of his character by the public, he became a supporting character in the plot.

Filmography

Television

Film

Internet

Stage

References

External links
 

1987 births
Living people
Male actors from Rio de Janeiro (city)
Brazilian male television actors
Brazilian male models
Brazilian male film actors
Brazilian male telenovela actors
Brazilian male stage actors